The Mile Island, part of the Big Green Group within the Furneaux Group, is a  granite island, located in Bass Strait west of Flinders Island, in Tasmania, in south-eastern Australia. The island is partly contained within a conservation area; and is part of the Chalky, Big Green and Badger Island Groups Important Bird Area.

Fauna
Recorded breeding seabird and wader species are little penguin, short-tailed shearwater, Pacific gull, sooty oystercatcher and black-faced cormorant.  The metallic skink is present.

See also

 List of islands of Tasmania

References

Furneaux Group
Important Bird Areas of Tasmania
Islands of Bass Strait
Islands of North East Tasmania